The China Academy of Space Technology (CAST) is a Chinese space agency and subordinate of China Aerospace Science and Technology Corporation (CASC). The agency was founded on 20 February 1968, and is the main spacecraft development and production facility in China. On 24 April 1970, CAST successfully launched China's first artificial satellite Dong Fang Hong I.

Space flight programmes 
CAST designs and manufactures the Dong Fang Hong satellites.

U.S. sanctions 

CAST is the majority shareholder of listed company China Spacesat. On 30 June, 2020, CAST owns 51.46% of China Spacesat Co. In August 2020, the United States Department of Defense published the names of companies linked to the People's Liberation Army operating directly or indirectly in the United States. China Spacesat Co. was included on the list. In November 2020, Donald Trump issued an executive order prohibiting any American company or individual from owning shares in companies that the United States Department of Defense has listed as having links to the People's Liberation Army, which included China Spacesat.

In August 2022, CAST's 502 and 513 Research Institutes were added to the United States Department of Commerce's Entity List.

References

External links 

 

Space program of the People's Republic of China
Research institutes in China
Research institutes established in 1968
1968 establishments in China